The 2016 Sacred Heart Pioneers football team represented Sacred Heart University in the 2016 NCAA Division I FCS football season. They were led by fourth year head coach Mark Nofri. They played their home games at Campus Field. They were a member of the Northeast Conference. They finished with a record of 6–5, 1–5 in NEC play, to finish in a three-way tie for fifth place.

Schedule

Source: Schedule

Game summaries

at Stetson

Valparaiso

Marist

at Stony Brook

at Wagner

at Cornell

Robert Morris

Saint Francis (PA)

at Central Connecticut

at Duquesne

Bryant

References

Sacred Heart
Sacred Heart Pioneers football seasons
Sacred Heart Pioneers football